KAAA is a radio station licensed to Kingman, Arizona, United States.

KAAA may also refer to:

KAAA, ICAO code of Logan County Airport in Lincoln, Illinois, United States
Kadoorie Agricultural Aid Association
Karlsruhe Accurate Arithmetic Approach, an approach to high-accuracy computation in computer sciences
 Kenya Amateur Athletics Association

See also
Kaa (disambiguation)